Tasik Biru is a state constituency in Sarawak, Malaysia, that has been represented in the Sarawak State Legislative Assembly since 1979.

The state constituency was created in the 1977 redistribution and is mandated to return a single member to the Sarawak State Legislative Assembly under the first past the post voting system.

History
2006–2016: The constituency contains the polling districts of Sajong, Apar, Buso, Tondong, Grogo, Bau, Skiat, Jagoi, Daun, Tanjong Poting, Atas, Barieng, Sudoh, Segong, Musi, Suba Buan, Suba Bau, Sibuloh, Sebuku, Taiton, Stass, Skibang, Sibobog, Serasot, Serikin, Bogag.

2016–present: The constituency contains the polling districts of Sajong, Apar, Buso, Tondong, Grogo, Bau, Skiat, Jagoi, Daun, Tanjong Poting, Atas, Barieng, Sudoh, Segong, Musi, Krokong, Tringgus, Bijuray Mongag, Sebuku, Taiton, Stass, Skibang, Sibobog, Serasot, Serikin, Bogag.

Representation history

Election results

References

Sarawak state constituencies